The Finnish Relief Fund was a humanitarian aid organization initiated by former U.S. President Herbert Hoover in December 1939. It was intended to support Finland during the Winter War. By March 1940, it had raised 2.5 million US dollars.

Hoover's campaign was advertised in 1,400 newspapers across the United States. The largest contributions came from private donors ($1.9 million), newspaper ads ($652,869), industrial companies ($318,188) and labor unions ($27,294). The income from first screening of the film Gone with the Wind in the state of Washington was forwarded to the relief fund.

See also 
Foreign support of Finland in the Winter War
Commission for Polish Relief

References

External links
Register of the Finnish Relief Fund Records, 1939-1946. Online Archive of California.
Report to American donors : December 1939-July 1940. (1940) Archive.org.
Minnesota's Help to Finland. $150,000 Contributed to Finnish Relief in Statewide Drive  Genealogia.fi.

Winter War
Herbert Hoover
Organizations established in 1939
Humanitarian aid organizations of World War II
1939 establishments in the United States